Pro Ecclesia et Pontifice ("For Church and Pope" in Latin) is a decoration of the Holy See. It is currently conferred for distinguished service to the Catholic Church by lay people and clergy.

History
The medal was established by Leo XIII on 17 July 1888 to commemorate his golden sacerdotal jubilee and was originally bestowed on those men and women who had aided and promoted the jubilee, and by other means assisted in making the jubilee and the Vatican Exposition successful.

In 1898, it became a permanent papal distinction. Pius X reduced the classes to a single one in 1908.

Until 1993, it was the highest honour that could be obtained by women.

Appearance

1888 version of Leo XIII
The cross was initially only cast in gold and silver. A bronze version was added later. On the medal is a cross made octangular by fleurs-de-lis fixed in the angles of the cross. The arms of the cross narrow towards the center, with slightly indented ends, approaching the form of the patonce cross. In the center of the cross is a small medal with the image of Leo XIII. The words "Leo XIII P. M. Anno X" (tenth year of his pontificate) circle the image. In the center of the reverse side are the papal emblems. The motto Pro Ecclesia et Pontifice is stamped in the circle surrounding the emblems.

Stamped on the reverse side are the words "Pridie" (on the left branch), "Kal" (on the top branch), and "Januar" (on the right branch) and the year "1888" (at the foot of the cross). The medal's ribbon is red, with delicate lines of white and yellow on each border. The cross is worn on the left side of breast.

Current version since Paul VI
The current version was introduced by pope Paul VI and is only awarded in gold. The obverse depicts the Apostles Saint Peter and Saint Paul in the centre of the cross. The inscription Pro Ecclesia (For Church) is stamped on the left arm, Et Pontifice (And Pope) on the right. Three small crosses are situated at the end of the left, bottom and right cross arm. During the pontificat of Paul VI and John Paul II, the top arm of the cross carried the coat of arms of the reigning Pope and his name in Latin on the bottom cross arm. The decoration's ribbon shows is yellow and white: the colors of the Papacy.

The design was modified under Benedict XVI: The individual coat of arms in the top arm of the decoration was replaced by a small cross while the coat of arms of the Holy See replaced the small cross on the bottom arm. The name of the reigning pope no longer appears on the front side.

Gallery

Recipients
1902 – Wilfred Spruson, Bessie Anstice Baker
1916 – Mary Kate Barlow
1924 – James Merry, organist and choirmaster of St Peter's, Cardiff, for over 40 years
1928 – Jano Köhler
1938 – Constance Le Plastrier, Agatha Le Breton
1938 – Catherine Bonifas
1947 – Edouard Heene
194x – Miguel Regidor Nadres
1954 – [[Ernest E. L. Hammer]]
1955 - Mrs. Emil Borth, for 50 years of service as organist at Sacred Heart Cathedral in Duluth, Minnesota, Richard Keys Biggs for 27 years of service as organist at Blessed Sacrament Catholic Church, Hollywood.
1968 - Xavier Sewell

1973 - William Maurice Carrigan
1977 - Kathleen Mary Burrow
1979 - Ayako Sono
1988 – Donald Swan, for Exceptional Service to Education in Greenwich, London
1997 -  Dolores R. Leckey
1997- Father Francis G. Morrisey, O.M.I. 
?    – Conor Mullaly, OFM
?    – Sister Margherita Marchione, MPF
2005 – David J. Young, Esq.
2006 – Rita Hamel Karing
2008 – Emmanuel Latif, Stanisław Pawlina FDP
2009 – Mother Mary Angelica of the Annunciation, PCPA
2013 – Paul Salamunovich
2017 – Anne Ward, for considerable contribution to the musical life of the Diocese of Arundel and Brighton.
2018 - Father Peter Michael Ryan,  
2019 – Father Philip G. Bochanski, Helen McConnell, Philip J. Miraglia, Louise M. Sullivan, Manuel A. Beltran, Sister Maureen Crissy, RSM, Becky Espanol, Kevin L. Hughes, Sister Patricia Kelly, MSBT, Brother Richard E. Kestler, FSC, Jose L. Lozad, Matthew McCloskey, Sister Anne Patricia Myers, SSJ, Sister M. Edward William Quinn, IHM, Thomas W. Smith
2020 – Emile Wijntuin, former Chairman of the National Assembly of Suriname.
2021 – Deirdre Leach MBE, Rev. Peter E. Sousa, CSsR, Rafael Manzano Martos, Manoj Durairaj
2022 – Pura Sumangil
2022 - John Bernard Flynn, Pat Kennedy Diocese of Hexham and Newcastle
2022 - Alejandro Aguspina Jr, Archdiocese of Cebu, Philippines and 8 other recipients

Notes

References

External links

 Pro Ecclesia et Pontifice For the Church and the Pope In: antique-photos.com.
 Ulrich Nersinger: Päpstliche Ritterorden und Auszeichnungen. In: ZENIT.org, 18. May 2007.
 P.M.J. Rock: Pontifical Decorations In: The Catholic Encyclopedia, New York: Robert Appleton Company, Vol. 4 1908.
 Ehrenzeichen (auch als ""Ehrenkreuz"" bezeichnet) "Pro Ecclesia et Pontefice" in: kuenker.de

Orders, decorations, and medals of the Holy See
Awards established in 1888
1888 establishments in Vatican City